There are more than 9,000 Grade I listed buildings in England. This page is a list of these buildings in the district of Oxford in Oxfordshire.

List of buildings

|}

See also

 Grade I listed buildings in Oxfordshire
 Grade I listed buildings in Cherwell (district)
 Grade I listed buildings in South Oxfordshire
 Grade I listed buildings in Vale of White Horse
 Grade I listed buildings in West Oxfordshire
 Grade II* listed buildings in Oxford

Notes

 
Oxford
Oxford